The Hong Kong and Nepal national cricket teams toured Sri Lanka from 9 November to 3 December 2014. The series, hosted by Sri Lanka Cricket, was part of a program organized by the Asian Cricket Council (ACC) to benefit non-Test-playing ACC members.

The series was initially planned to feature three Twenty20 Internationals and a List A match between the two teams, along with two three-day matches against a Sri Lanka Cricket XI, with the matches played in Dambulla and Kurunegala However, due to regular rain in Dambulla, the T20I series was shortened and rescheduled to one match, and the List A match moved a day earlier, with both matches being scheduled in Colombo. The T20I match was won by Hong Kong.

Squads

Tour matches

Three-day matches

T20I series

1st T20I

2nd T20I

2nd T20I (re-scheduled)

3rd T20I

List A series

Only List A

T20I series (rescheduled)

Only T20I

References

External links
 Series home at ESPN Cricinfo

International cricket competitions in 2014–15
2014 in Sri Lankan cricket
2014 in Nepalese cricket
2014 in Hong Kong cricket
2014-15
2014-15